Serranus psittacinus, also known by its common name barred serrano, is a species of fish from the genus Serranus.

References

psittacinus